
Gmina Czernichów is a rural gmina (administrative district) in Kraków County, Lesser Poland Voivodeship, in southern Poland.

Gmina Czernichów is located on the Vistula river, among limestone and hillocks covered with forests. It includes parts of the protected areas called Bielany-Tyniec Landscape Park and Rudawy Landscape Park. There is also a nature park, "Kajasówka", which is an excellent example of steppes in the landscape.

Villages
Gmina Czernichów contains the villages of Bednarze, Czernichów, Czułówek, Dąbrowa Szlachecka, Kamień, Kłokoczyn, Nowa Wieś Szlachecka, Przeginia Duchowna, Przeginia Narodowa, Ratanice, Rusocice, Rybna, Wołowice and Zagacie.

Neighbouring gminas
Gmina Czernichów is bordered by the gminas of Alwernia, Brzeźnica, Krzeszowice, Liszki, Skawina and Spytkowice.

References
Polish official population figures 2006

Czernichow
Kraków County